Günther Meier  (July 26, 1941 – November 23, 2020) was a German amateur boxer who competed in the Light Middleweight (71 kg) category. He won an Olympic bronze medal in 1968.  Meier also competed as a welterweight at the 1972 Munich Olympics where he was eliminated in the quarterfinals. He was born in Nuremberg.

1972 Olympic results
 Round of 64: bye
 Round of 32: defeated Jeff Rackley (New Zealand) by decision, 5-0
 Round of 16: defeated Sangnual Rabieb (Thailand) by decision, 5-0
 Quarterfinal: lost to Emilio Correa (Cuba) by decision 2-3

References
Olympic Profile
Olympic Results
Günther Meier's obituary  

1941 births
2020 deaths
Sportspeople from Nuremberg
Boxers at the 1968 Summer Olympics
Boxers at the 1972 Summer Olympics
Olympic bronze medalists for West Germany
Olympic boxers of West Germany
Olympic medalists in boxing
German male boxers
Medalists at the 1968 Summer Olympics
Light-middleweight boxers
20th-century German people
21st-century German people